Punarnava may refer to:
Boerhavia diffusa, a species of flowering plant
Punarnava Mehta, the moniker of Indian actress Pakhi Tyrewala
Punarnava (poem), a 1991 poem by Rajlukshmee Debee Bhattacharya